Lu Ban (–444BC) was a Chinese architect or master carpenter, structural engineer, and inventor, during the Zhou Dynasty. He is revered as the Chinese Deity (Patron) of builders and contractors.

Life
Lu Ban was born in the state of Lu; a few sources claim he was born further to the west, in Dunhuang, to a family of carpenters or artisans during the Spring and Autumn period of the Zhou dynasty. He was supposed to have been an indifferent pupil until his love of learning was kindled by the scholar Zi Xia. He later learned woodworking from Bao Laodong. The great demand for his work supposedly compelled him to invent or improve several carpenter's tools—the saw, the square, the planer, the drill, the shovel, and an ink marking tool—to complete his many projects more quickly. His wife was also credited with inventing the umbrella in order to permit him to work in inclement weather.

Inventions
According to tradition, he was responsible for several inventions:

 Cloud ladder—a mobile, counterweighted siege ladder.
 Grappling hooks and ram—implements for naval warfare.
 Wooden bird—a non-powered, flying, wooden bird which could stay in the air for three days. It has been suggested to be a prototype of a kite.
The saw. Legend has it that when Lu Ban was grabbing hold of tree trunks in order to climb a steep slope while gathering firewood, his hand was cut by a leaf with spiny texture. He then realized that he could turn the leaf's texture into a more efficient tool for tree-cutting, namely the saw.

Other inventions were also attributed to him, such as a lifting implement to assist with burial, a wooden horse carriage and coachman, a pedal-powered cycle, and other woodworking mentioned in various texts, which thereafter led Lu Ban to be acknowledged as a master craftsman:

 The Book of Lineages (Shiben), written c. the 3rd century BC.
 The Tales of the Marvelous, by Ren Fang, written c. the 5th century AD.
 The Records of Origin on Things and Affairs, by Gao Cheng, written c. the 11th century.
 The Origin on Things, by Luo Qi, written c. the 15th century.
 The Treatise of Lu Ban, attributed to Lu Ban, written in the 13th, 14th, or 15th century.

Legacy
Lu Ban is revered as the god of carpentry and masonry in Chinese folk religion. His personality is assumed by the master carpenter involved in the construction of houses among the Dong. He is sometimes counted among the Five Kings of the Water Immortals, Taoist water gods invoked by sailors for protection while carrying out journeys.

He is referenced in a number of Chinese idioms. The Chinese equivalent of "teaching one's grandmother to suck eggs" is to "brandish one's axe at Lu Ban's door". His cultural companion is the stone worker Wang Er, who lived around the same time.

The modern artist Shi Lu has claimed that Lu Ban was an alias of his contemporary Confucius, but this seems dubious.

See also
 Shuixian Zunwang
 Lo Pan Temple, Kennedy Town, Hong Kong
 Pisatao

Notes

References

Citations

Bibliography
 .
 .
 .
 .
 .
 .
 .

External links

A Restoration of Lu-Ban's Wooden Horse Carriage (PDF)
Mozi (Chinese text and Mei translation) - Chinese Text Project

500s BC births
444 BC deaths
Year of birth uncertain
5th-century BC Chinese people
Chinese carpenters
Chinese gods
Crafts gods
Chinese inventors
Chinese structural engineers
Deified Chinese people
Engineers from Shandong
Lu (state)
Water gods
5th-century BC architects